Shraap 3D (English: Curse) is an upcoming Indian Bollywood horror film written and directed by Faisal Saif and produced by Neelam Sharma, under the Neelam Sharma Entertainment banner. The director of the film confirmed that the script of the film was written in both Hindi and Tamil languages.

Plot
A CBI officer (Yadav) has an experience with a ghost (Radheshyam).

Cast

Rajpal Yadav
Kavita Radheshyam
Mythriya Gowda
Nishant Pandey
Dev Sharma
Yashpal Sharma
Asif Basra
Aanjjan Srivastav
Amita Nangia
Himani Shivpuri
Aryan Vaid
Anupam Shyam
Tracy Jona
Pankaj Berry
Karan Kashyap

Production
The principal photography of the film began in January 2016 and was released in February 2018, with Rajpal Yadav and Kavita Radheshyam starring. Controversial Kannada actress Mythriya Gowda was approached and picked over several other actresses to also star in the film.

References

External links
 

Unreleased Hindi-language films
Indian vampire films
Indian horror thriller films
Indian 3D films
Films shot in Mumbai
Indian ghost films
Films directed by Faisal Saif